Beginning may refer to:

Beginning, an album by Pakho Chau
Beginning (play), a 2017 play by David Eldridge
Beginning (2020 film), a Georgian-French drama film
Beginning (2023 film), an Indian Tamil-language drama film
"Beginning", a song by heavy metal band Kotipelto
"Beginning", a 2018 track by Toby Fox from Deltarune Chapter 1 OST from the video game Deltarune

See also

Begin (disambiguation)
Beginnings (disambiguation)
In the Beginning (disambiguation)
The Beginning (disambiguation)